Eugenio Montale (12 October 1896 – 12 September 1981) was an Italian poet, prose writer, editor and translator, and recipient of the 1975 Nobel Prize in Literature.

Life and works

Early years
Montale was born in Genoa. His family were chemical products traders (his father supplied Italo Svevo's firm). Montale was the youngest of six sons.

Montale was largely self-taught. Growing up, his imagination was caught by several writers, including Dante Alighieri, and by the study of foreign languages (especially English), as well as the landscapes of the Levante ("Eastern") Liguria, where he spent holidays with his family.

Poetic works
Montale wrote more than ten anthologies of short lyrics, a journal of poetry translation, plus several books of prose translations, two books of literary criticism, and one of fantasy prose. Alongside his imaginative work he was a constant contributor to Italy's most important newspaper, the Corriere della Sera, for which he wrote a huge number of articles on literature, music, and art. He also wrote a foreword to Dante's "The Divine Comedy", in which he mentions the credibility of Dante, and his insight and unbiased imagination. In 1925 he was a signatory to the Manifesto of the Anti-Fascist Intellectuals. Montale's own politics inclined toward the liberalism of Piero Gobetti and Benedetto Croce. He contributed to Gobetti's literary magazine Il Baretti.

Montale's work, especially his first poetry collection Ossi di seppia ("Cuttlefish Bones"), which appeared in 1925, shows him as an antifascist who felt detached from contemporary life and found solace and refuge in the solitude of nature.

Anticonformism of the new poetry
Montale moved to Florence in 1927 to work as editor for the publisher Bemporad. Florence was the cradle of Italian poetry of that age, with works like the Canti orfici by Dino Campana (1914) and the first lyrics by Ungaretti for the review Lacerba. Other poets like Umberto Saba and Vincenzo Cardarelli had been highly praised. In 1929 Montale was asked to be chairman of the Gabinetto Vieusseux Library, a post from which he was expelled in 1938 by the fascist government. By this time Montale's poetry was a reaction against the literary style of the fascist regime. He collaborated with the magazine Solaria, and (starting in 1927) frequented the literary café Le Giubbe Rosse ("Red Jackets") on the Piazza Vittoria (now Piazza della Repubblica). Visiting the café often several times a day, he became a central figure among a group of writers there, including Carlo Emilio Gadda, Arturo Loria and Elio Vittorini (all founders of the magazine). He wrote for almost all the important literary magazines of the time.

Though hindered by financial problems and the literary and social conformism imposed by the authorities, in Florence Montale published his finest anthology, Le occasioni ("Occasions", 1939). From 1933 to 1938 he had a love relationship with Irma Brandeis, a Jewish-American scholar of Dante who occasionally visited Italy for short periods.  After falling in love with Brandeis, Montale represented her as a mediatrix figure like Dante's Beatrice. Le occasioni contains numerous allusions to Brandeis, here called Clizia (a senhal). Franco Fortini judged Montale's Ossi di seppia and Le occasioni the high-water mark of 20th century Italian poetry.

T.S. Eliot, who shared Montale's admiration for Dante, was an important influence on his poetry at this time; in fact, the new poems of Eliot were shown to Montale by Mario Praz, then teaching in Manchester. The concept of the objective correlative used by Montale in his poetry, was probably influenced by T. S. Eliot. In 1948, for Eliot's sixtieth birthday, Montale contributed a celebratory essay entitled "Eliot and Ourselves" to a collection published to mark the occasion.

Disharmony with the world
From 1948 to his death, Montale lived in Milan. After the war, he was a member of the liberal Partito d'Azione. As a contributor to the Corriere della Sera he was music editor and also reported from abroad, including Israel, where he went as a reporter to follow Pope Paul VI's visit there. His works as a journalist are collected in Fuori di casa ("Out of Home", 1969).

La bufera e altro ("The Storm and Other Things") was published in 1956 and marks the end of Montale's most acclaimed poetry. Here his figure Clizia is joined by La Volpe ("the Fox"), based on the young poet Maria Luisa Spaziani with whom Montale had an affair during the 1950s. However, this volume also features Clizia, treated in a variety of poems as a kind of bird-goddess who defies Hitler. These are some of his greatest poems.

His later works are Xenia (1966), Satura (1971) and Diario del '71 e del '72 (1973). Montale's later poetry is wry and ironic, musing on the critical reaction to his earlier work and on the constantly changing world around him. Satura contains a poignant elegy to his wife Drusilla Tanzi. He also wrote a series of poignant poems about Clizia shortly before his death. Montale's fame at that point had extended throughout the world. He had received honorary degrees from the Universities of Milan (1961), Cambridge (1967), Rome (1974), and had been named Senator-for-Life in the Italian Senate. In 1973 he was awarded the Golden Wreath of the Struga Poetry Evenings in Struga, SR Macedonia. In 1975 he received the Nobel Prize for Literature.

Montale died in Milan in 1981.

In 1996, a work appeared called Posthumous Diary (Diario postumo) that purported to have been 'compiled' by Montale before his death, with the help of the young poet Annalisa Cima; the critic Dante Isella thinks that this work is not authentic. Joseph Brodsky dedicated his essay "In the Shadow of Dante" to Eugenio Montale's lyric poetry.

List of works
Each year links to its corresponding "[year] in literature" or "[year] in poetry" article:
 1925: Ossi di seppia ("Cuttlefish Bones"), first edition; second edition, 1928, with six new poems and an introduction by Alfredo Gargiulo; third edition, 1931, Lanciano: Carabba
 1932: La casa dei doganieri e altre poesie, a chapbook of five poems published in association with the award of the Premio del Antico Fattore to Montale; Florence: Vallecchi
 1939: Le occasioni ("The Occasions"), Turin: Einaudi
 1943: Finisterre, a chapbook of poetry, smuggled into Switzerland by Gianfranco Contini; Lugano: the Collana di Lugano (24 June); second edition, 1945, Florence: Barbèra
 1948: Quaderno di traduzioni, translations, Milan: Edizioni della Meridiana
 1948: La fiera letteraria poetry criticism
 1956: La bufera e altro ("The Storm and Other Things"), a first edition of 1,000 copies, Venice: Neri Pozza; second, larger edition published in 1957, Milan: Arnaldo Mondadore Editore
 1956: Farfalla di Dinard, stories, a private edition
 1962: Satura, poetry, published in a private edition, Verona: Oficina Bodoni
 1962: Accordi e pastelli ("Agreements and Pastels"), Milan: Scheiwiller (May)
 1966: Il colpevole
 1966: Auto da fé: Cronache in due tempi, cultural criticism, Milan: Il Saggiatore
 1966: Xenia, poems in memory of Mosca, first published in a private edition of 50
 1969: Fuori di casa, collected travel writing
 1971: Satura (1962–1970) (January)
 1971: La poesia non esiste, prose; Milan: Scheiwiller (February)
 1973: Diario del '71 e del '72, Milan: Arnoldo Mondadori Editore (a private edition of 100 copies was published in 1971)
 1973: Trentadue variazioni, an edition of 250 copies, Milan: Giorgio Lucini
 1977: Quaderno di quattro anni, Milan: Mondadori
 1977: Tutte le poesie, Milan: Mondadori
 1980: L'opera in versi, the Bettarini-Contini edition; published in 1981 as Altri verse e poesie disperse, publisher: Mondadori

Translated in Montale's lifetime
 1966: Ossi di seppia, Le occasioni, and La bufera e altro, translated by Patrice Angelini into French; Paris: Gallimard
 1978: The Storm & Other Poems, translated by Charles Wright into English (Oberlin College Press), 

Posthumous
 1981: Prime alla Scala, music criticism, edited by Gianfranca Lavezzi; Milan: Mondadori
 1981: Lettere a Quasimodo, edited by Sebastiano Grasso; publisher: Bompiani
 1982: The Second Life of Art: Selected Essays, trans. Jonathan Galassi (Ecco), 
 1983: Quaderno genovese, edited by Laura Barile; a journal from 1917, first published this year; Milan: Mondadori
 1987: Trans. William Arrowsmith, The Occasions (Norton, New York & London).
 1990: The Coastguard’s House / La casa dei doganieri : Selected Poems (Bloodaxe Books, Newcastle-upon-Tyne).
 1991: Tutte le poesie, edited by Giorgio Zampa. Jonathan Galassi calls this book the "most comprehensive edition of Montale's poems".
 1996: Diario postumo: 66 poesie e altre, edited by Annalisa Cima; Milan: Mondadori
 1996: Il secondo mestiere: Arte, musica, società and Il secondo mestierre: Prose 1929–1979, a two-volume edition including all of Montale's published writings; edited by Giorgio Zampa; Milan: Mondadori
 1998: Satura : 1962-1970 / trans. with notes, by William Arrowsmith (New York, Norton).
 1999: Collected Poems, trans. Jonathan Galassi (Carcanet) (Oxford-Weidenfeld Translation Prize)
 2004: Selected Poems, trans. Jonathan Galassi, Charles Wright, & David Young (Oberlin College Press), 
 2016: Xenia (Arc Publications). pbk: ; hbk: ; e-book: . Bilingual version, translated by Mario Petrucci, winner of 2016 PEN Translates Award, shortlisted for 2018 John Florio Prize.
 2017: Montale's Essential: The Poems of Eugenio Montale in English, translated by Alessandro Baruffi (Literary Joint Press),

Notes

Further reading
 Montale, Eugenio. "Eliot and Ourselves." In T. S. Eliot: A Symposium, edited by Richard March and Tambimuttu, 190–195. London: Editions Poetry, 1948.
 Pietro Montorfani, "Il mio sogno di te non è finito": ipotesi di speranza nell'universo montaliano, in "Sacra doctrina", (55) 2010, pp. 185–196.

External links

 
  including the Nobel Lecture December 12, 1975 Is Poetry Still Possible?
 
 

1896 births
1981 deaths
Writers from Genoa
Action Party (Italy) politicians
Italian Liberal Party politicians
Italian Republican Party politicians
Italian life senators
Politicians from Genoa
Italian male poets
English–Italian translators
Translators of John Steinbeck
Translators of T. S. Eliot
Chapbook writers
20th-century Italian poets
Manifesto of the Anti-Fascist Intellectuals
Italian anti-fascists
Italian military personnel of World War I
Italian Nobel laureates
Nobel laureates in Literature
Struga Poetry Evenings Golden Wreath laureates
20th-century Italian translators